Legislative elections were held in Guam on Tuesday, November 3, 2020, along with the election for the Guam delegate to the U.S. House of Representatives. Before the election, the Democratic Party held ten of the fifteen seats in the Legislature while the Republican Party held five seats. The election resulted in a gain of two seats for the Republican and a loss of two seats for Democrats to retain. Democrats also won the runoff race for Guam's US House Delegate.

Primary
Because of the COVID-19 pandemic, Guam cancelled its August primary elections. All 29 certified candidates advanced to the Legislative general election and appeared on the ballot in November 2020.

Candidates

Democratic

Declared

Declined

Republican

Withdrew

Declined

Results
The members of the legislature are elected at-large with the first 15 winning candidates elected as the new members of the legislature. 
The Republican Party picked up two seats from Democrats, leaving the composition for the next legislature at 8 Democrats and 7 Republicans. Democrat Michael F.Q. San Nicolas also won the re-election for the runoff Delegate.

Incoming Senators to the 36th Guam Legislature
There were 15 senators elected on November 3, 2020, to serve in the 36th Guam Legislature and set to inaugurated on January 4, 2021:

Democratic

Incumbents
 Joe S. San Agustin
 Telena Nelson
 Therese M. Terlaje
 Tina Muña Barnes
 Amanda Shelton
 Clynt Ridgell
 Sabina E. Perez
 Jose "Pedo" T. Terlaje

Republican

Incumbents
Mary Camacho Torres
Telo T. Taitague
James C. Moylan

Freshman
Frank F. Blas Jr. (returning)
V. Anthony "Tony" Ada (returning)
Joanne M. Brown (returning)
Christopher M. Duenas (returning)

See also
2020 Guam local election
2020 Guam general election

References

Legislative
Legislative elections in Guam